is a Japanese manga author and illustrator. One of her most notable works was Colorful Palette.

Works

References

1970 births
Living people
Manga artists